Thomas N. Heffron (June 13, 1872 – May 24, 1951) was a screenwriter, actor, and a director. He was born in Nevada, He worked as an attorney and danced in vaudeville before he began his career in film with Thanhousr in 1911, eventually landing him a role with Paramount Pictures a few years later. He left the movie industry in 1922, making all his movies in the silent era. 

Heffron directed films for Famous Players studio.

He died in 1951 at the age of 79 in San Francisco, California.

Partial filmography
The Brute (1914)
The Only Son (1914)
The Scales of Justice (1914)
The Man from Mexico (1914)
Aristocracy (1914)
Mrs. Black Is Back (1914)
The Million (1914)
Gretna Green (1915)
 The House of a Thousand Candles (1915)
Are You a Mason? (1915)
The Planter (1917)
Mountain Dew (1917)
 The Stainless Barrier (1917)
Tony America (1918)
A Man's Fight (1919)
Thou Art the Man (1920)
The City of Masks (1920)
The Little Clown (1921)
Her Sturdy Oak (1921)
A Kiss in Time (1921)
Sham (1921)
Her Face Value (1921)
The Love Charm (1921)
 The Truant Husband (1921)
Bobbed Hair (1922)
Too Much Wife (1922)
The Truthful Liar (1922)
 A Wife's Romance (1923)

References

External links

1872 births
American male silent film actors
American male screenwriters
1951 deaths
20th-century American male actors
Male actors from Nevada
Film directors from Nevada
People from Virginia City, Nevada
Screenwriters from Nevada
20th-century American male writers
20th-century American screenwriters